The 2005 Liège–Bastogne–Liège was the 91st edition of the Liège–Bastogne–Liège, one of the five monuments of cycling. Alexander Vinokourov was able to beat Jens Voigt after they had broken away from the pack 72 km from the end. Michael Boogerd took the last spot on the podium after countering an attack from Cadel Evans on the final climb of the day.

Results

References

External links
Race website

2005
2005 UCI ProTour
2005 in Belgian sport